Risher is a surname. Notable people with the surname include:

 Alan Risher (born 1961), American football player
 Anna Priscilla Risher
 David Risher (born 1965), American businessman and philanthropist
 John R. Risher (1938–1999), American attorney
 Tim Risher (born 1957), American composer